"Right in the Night (Fall in Love with Music)" is a song by German electronic music duo Jam & Spoon, released as the second single from their second album, Tripomatic Fairytales 2001 (1993). It is a Eurodance song with elements from progressive and vocal trance. It is based on "Leyenda" by the classical composer Isaac Albéniz and features vocals by American vocalist Plavka, with lyrics by Nosie Katzmann. The flamenco-styled riff in the song is played by El Mar, who was trained as a classical guitarist.

The single was released in 1993 on the German label Dance Pool. It is widely regarded as one of the biggest electronic music anthems of the 1990s, reaching number one in Finland, Greece and Spain, as well as number two in Australia, Iceland and Italy in 1994. On the Eurochart Hot 100, "Right in the Night" peaked at number four. On the UK Singles Chart, the song originally peaked at number 31, but after a re-release in 1995 it reached a new peak of number ten. It has been extensively anthologised, further indicating the song's significance in trance music's evolution.

Jam & Spoon and Plavka performed the song on many different European TV-shows and concerts, like the British music chart television programme Top of the Pops, the Italian singing competition Festivalbar and the Finnish 1994 national final of Eurovision Song Contest. It earned the duo an award in the category for "Best Progressive hi-NRG Recording" at the 1995 Hi-NRG Music Awards in the US.

Release
In the 2017 book Stars of 90's Dance Pop: 29 Hitmakers Discuss Their Careers by James Arena, writer of the song Nosie Katzmann told, "I always felt "Right in the Night" was one of the best songs I've ever written, but the record company and A&R people who came to my place to listen to new songs for the project just thought of "Right" as being average. Some other individuals from A&R asked, "Where's the hook—the punchline?" I really hated to play the song for the record company, and a week before it came out I thought for sure it would be a flop because the label people just didn't hear the hit in it. And just like most times, the label people were wrong." In 2020, Jam El Mar told in an interview about how the duo found Plavka, "Mark Spoon knew Plavka from the very first Love Parade. He was clever enough to ask for her number so, when we were about to record Right In The Night, he opened his magic book of secret telephone numbers."

In 2013, the song was released in a new remix, by Jam & Spoon vs. David May & Amfree.

Critical reception
Barry Walters from The Advocate wrote that the song "distills Jam & Spoon's most accessible aspects into one flawlessly girly flamenco-style hi-NRG anthem." Larry Flick from Billboard described it as a "jumpy, disco/pop ditty that strobes with bright synths and a killer hook." He noted that "at first, singer Plavka will have you thinking of Madonna, though her own unique tones and nuances eventually shine through. She has a field day with the song, more than holding her own against the track's busy array of sound effects." In a 1997 review, the magazine called it a "percolating ditty [that] was years ahead of its time, since the groove and synths sound as fresh as ever. And the splashes of flamenco guitars are an enticing flavor". Annette M. Lai from the Gavin Report felt that "this high-energy tune should have no trouble making its way up the chart soon." James Masterton wrote in his weekly UK chart commentary, "It's combination of a brilliant pop tune and rampant flamenco rhythms should be enough to make it the biggest hit of the next few months." 

On the 1995 re-release he added, "Sweet music to my ears, I love this to bits and commented in these lines back in 1994 that it had the potential to be a No.1 hit - I could still be right." Pan-European magazine Music & Media commented that "this fast but mellow house track with ambient works so well that it should go a long way to establish this well-reputed remix and production duo as artists in their own right." Columnist Maria Jimenez described it as "alluring, yet highly commercial", adding that "this club track is poised for international success." Andy Beevers from Music Week rated it four out of five, calling it a "rather unexciting Euro house song". Wendi Cermak from The Network Forty stated that "this is signature Jam & Spoon with its ethereal trance/ambient electronic rhythms, light female vocals and their excellent guitar work on the intro". James Hamilton from the RM Dance Update declared it as an "excellent Madonna-ish Balearic throbber".

Chart performance
"Right in the Night" was very successful on the charts on several continents, remaining one of the duo's biggest hit to date. In Europe, it peaked at number-one in Finland, Greece and Spain, with a total of five weeks at the top position there, and within the top 10 in Austria, Belgium, Denmark, Germany, Iceland (number two), Italy (number two), the Netherlands, Norway (number four), Scotland, Sweden, Switzerland (number four) and the United Kingdom, as well as on the Eurochart Hot 100, where it made it to number four. On MTV's European Top 20, it peaked at number five. In the UK, the single reached number ten in its second run on the UK Singles Chart on 11 June 1995. But on the UK Dance Chart, it peaked at number six. Outside Europe, "Right in the Night" climbed to the number-one position on the RPM Dance/Urban chart in Canada, number two in Australia, number three on the Billboard Dance Club Songs chart in the US and number nine in New Zealand. It earned a gold record in Germany, after 250,000 singles were sold, and a platinum record in Australia, with a sale of 70,000 singles.

Music video
The accompanying music video of "Right in the Night" was directed by Swedish-based director Matt Broadley. It received heavy rotation on MTV Europe and was A-listed on Germany's VIVA. There are two different versions of the video, which the one focuses more on Plavka than the another one. There was also made a video for the 2013 remix by Jam & Spoon vs. David May & Amfree. It also featured new footage of Plavka and was published on YouTube in August 2013. As of December 2022, the video had generated more than 2,3 million views.

Track listings

 12-inch, UK and Europe
"Right in the Night (Fall in Love with Music)" (Full Length Mix) — 6:05
"Right in the Night (Fall in Love with Music)" (Love Mix) — 5:37
"Follow Me!" – 12:28

 CD single, Europe
"Right in the Night" (Radio Edit) — 3:47
"Right in the Night" (Instrumental) — 6:51

 CD maxi 1, Germany
 "Right in the Night (Fall in Love with Music)" — 6:05
 "Right in the Night (Fall in Love with Music)" (Instrumental) — 6:51
 "Follow Me!" — 12:28
 "Right in the Night (Fall in Love with Music)" (Radio Edit) — 3:47

 CD maxi 2, Germany
 "Right in the Night (Fall in Love with Music)" (Jam & Spoon Remix) — 5:45
 "Right in the Night (Fall in Love with Music)" (Microbots-Remix) — 6:23
 "Right in the Night (Fall in Love with Music)" (Arpeggiators - Tripomatic Fairytales Mix) — 6:27
 "Right in the Night (Fall in Love with Music)" (DJ Kid Paul Mix) — 5:52

Charts

Weekly charts

Year-end charts

Certifications

Release history

Whigfield cover

Danish recording artist Whigfield covered "Right in the Night" in 2007. It was released on 10 July 2008 as the second single from her greatest hits album All in One.

Track listing
 "Right in the Night" (Favretto & Battini Remix Radio Edit) – 3:37
 "Right in the Night" (F&A Factor Remix Radio Edit) – 3:48
 "Right in the Night" (Doing Time Remix Radio Edit) – 3:29
 "Right in the Night" (Original) – 4:32
 "Right in the Night" (Favretto & Battani Remix Extended) – 7:46
 "Right in the Night" (F&A Factor Remix Extended) – 7:56
 "Right in the Night" (Doing Time Remix Extended) – 5:18

Other official versions:
"Right in the Night" (Enrique & Danny Merx Remix) – 6:53 (Canadian download)
"Right in the Night" (Fabian Gray Remix) – 7:39 (Canadian download)

2013 version

On 26 April 2013, a remix version by David May and Amfree entitled "Right in the Night 2013" was released by Epic Records.

Track listing
 CD single
"Right in the Night 2013" (featuring Plavka vs. David May and Amfree) (featuring Nate) (radio edit) – 3:30
"Right in the Night 2013" (featuring Plavka vs. David May and Amfree) (Groove Coverage remix) – 5:28

 Digital download
"Right in the Night 2013" (featuring Plavka vs. David May and Amfree) (featuring Nate) (radio edit) – 3:29
"Right in the Night 2013" (featuring Plavka vs. David May and Amfree) (Bodybangers remix) – 5:24
"Right in the Night 2013" (featuring Plavka vs. David May and Amfree) (Groove Coverage remix) – 5:28
"Right in the Night 2013" (featuring Plavka vs. David May and Amfree) (Michael Mind Project remix) – 5:42
"Right in the Night 2013" (featuring Plavka vs. David May and Amfree) (radio edit without rap) – 3:13
"Right in the Night 2013" (featuring Plavka vs. David May and Amfree) (extended mix) – 5:20
"Right in the Night 2013" (featuring Plavka vs. David May and Amfree) (classic mix 2K13) – 4:08

Charts

References

External links
Video clip on YouTube
Jam & Spoon's "Right in the Night" on Discogs

1993 songs
1993 singles
1995 singles
2008 singles
Jam & Spoon songs
Whigfield songs
Songs written by Nosie Katzmann
Music videos directed by Matt Broadley
Number-one singles in Finland
Number-one singles in Greece
Number-one singles in Spain
Dance Pool singles
English-language German songs
Songs about nights